Carom Shots is a 1963 French comedy film directed by Marcel Bluwal. It was entered into the 1963 Cannes Film Festival. The French crime writer  felt his novel had been betrayed by the filmmakers.

Cast
 Jean-Claude Brialy as Paul Martin
 Louis de Funès as Norbert Charolais
 Michel Serrault as Le commissaire Baudu / Policeman Baudu
 Sophie Daumier as Solange
 Anne Tonietti as Danielle Brossard
 Henri Virlojeux as Brossard
 Alfred Adam as Hubert Beaumanoir
 Marcelle Arnold as Mademoiselle Andréa
 René Clermont as Frépillon
 Jacques Dynam as Macheron
 Paul Gay as Le speaker TV / TV anchor
 Gilberte Géniat as Madame Brossard

References

External links

1963 films
1963 comedy films
1963 drama films
1960s black comedy films
1960s French-language films
French black-and-white films
French black comedy films
Films about businesspeople
Films directed by Marcel Bluwal
Films with screenplays by Michel Audiard
Films scored by Gérard Calvi
Films with screenplays by Pierre Tchernia
1960s French films